Ram Ayodhya Prasad Yadav is a member of 2nd Nepalese Constituent Assembly. He won Bara–1 seat in CA assembly, 2013 from Nepali Congress.

References

Year of birth missing (living people)
Living people
Nepali Congress politicians from Madhesh Province
Members of the 2nd Nepalese Constituent Assembly